William James Sibree Tudor (born 11 April 1987) is an English actor, known for his role as Olyvar in the HBO series Game of Thrones from 2013 to 2015. He has also appeared in the miniseries The Red Tent, and the Channel 4 series Humans. From 2017 to 2018, he portrayed Sebastian Verlac/Jonathan Morgenstern on the Freeform series Shadowhunters.

Filmography

References

External links
 

1987 births
Living people
21st-century English male actors
English male film actors
English male television actors
Male actors from London